The year 1588 in science and technology, Armada year, included a number of events, some of which are listed here.

Astronomy
 Tycho Brahe publishes De mundi aetheri recentioribus phaenomenis in Uraniborg.
 Giovanni Paolo Gallucci publishes his star atlas Theatrum Mundi et Temporis (Theater of the world and time).

History of science
 October 7 – The first biography of Nicolaus Copernicus (died 1543) is completed by Bernardino Baldi.

Mathematics
 Pietro Cataldi discovers the sixth and seventh Mersenne primes by this year.
 Giovanni Antonio Magini is chosen over Galileo to occupy the chair of mathematics at the University of Bologna after the death of Egnatio Danti.
 Ferdinando I de Medici, Grand Duke of Tuscany, appoints Galileo to the professorship of mathematics at the University of Pisa.

Medicine
 Joachim Camerarius the younger publishes Hortus medicus.
 Thomas Muffet publishes Nosomantica Hippocratea.

Technology
 Agostino Ramelli publishes Le diverse et artificiose Machine del Capitano Agostino Ramelli, Dal Ponte Della Tresia Ingegniero del Christianissimo Re di Francia et di Pollonia in Paris.

Births
 May 2 – Étienne Pascal, French mathematician (died 1651)
 May 13 – Ole Worm, Danish physician, natural historian and antiquary (died 1655)
 September 8 – Marin Mersenne, French mathematician (died 1648)
 December 10 – Isaac Beeckman, Dutch philosopher and scientist (died 1637)
 Jean-Jacques Chifflet, French physician and antiquary (died 1660)
 Jan Janssonius, Dutch cartographer (died 1664)
 Cassiano dal Pozzo, Italian scholar and patron (died 1657)

Deaths
 February 24 – Johann Weyer, Dutch physician and occultist (born 1515)
 March 1 – Jacques Daléchamps, French physician and botanist (born 1513)
 March 10 – Theodor Zwinger the elder, Swiss philosopher, physician and encyclopedist (born 1533)
 May 5 – Giorgio Biandrata, Italian court physician (born 1515)
 October 2–  Bernardino Telesio, Italian philosopher and natural scientist (born 1509)
 Leonardo Fioravanti, Bolognese physician (born 1517)
 Jacques le Moyne, French scientific illustrator (born c. 1533)

References

 
16th century in science
1580s in science